Still/Born is a 2017 Canadian psychological horror film directed and co-written by Brandon Christensen and starring Christie Burke and Jesse Moss. It premiered on April 29, 2017 at the Overlook Film Festival and received generally positive reviews, with critics praising Burke's performance as Mary.

Plot
Mary (Christie Burke), in her first pregnancy, gives birth to twins. However, only one of them survives. Mary then starts showing postpartum depression symptoms, and becomes convinced that an evil entity wants to take her surviving baby.

After Mary's husband leaves for a business trip, and after some events transpire, Mary starts to fear for her child's life.

Cast
 Christie Burke as Mary
 Jesse Moss as Jack
 Rebecca Olson as Rachel
 Jenn Griffin as Jane
 Michael Ironside as Dr. Neilson

Reception 
On review aggregator Rotten Tomatoes, Still/Born has an approval rating of 67% based on 21 reviews. The site's critical consensus reads: "Still/Born puts an intriguing psychological spin on its supernatural horror story, elevated by standout work from star Christie Burke." On Metacritic, another review aggregator, the film has a weighted average score of 63 out of 100, based on 4 critics, meaning "generally favorable reviews".

Noel Murray of the Los Angeles Times wrote: "First-time feature director Brandon Christensen brings some impressive snap to the postnatal spook-show 'Still/Born.' Christensen and co-writer Colin Minihan mostly repeat old beats from suburban supernatural horror films like 'Poltergeist' and 'Paranormal Activity,' but strong actors and lean, unfussy storytelling ought to be more than enough to please genre buffs." Frank Scheck of The Hollywood Reporter stated: "Tapping into elemental motherhood fears, not to mention the specter of post-partum depression, Still/Born works most effectively in its subtler, more enigmatic moments than when it indulges in familiar horror film conventions. Nevertheless, it does offer a consistent level of tension, a few decent scares and a terrific lead turn by Christie Burke." Nick Allen of RogerEbert.com gave the film 3 out of 4 stars and said: "'Still/Born' doesn't get as many points as one would hope for originality. But this is an inspired-enough take on a woman's horror, where the fear of losing her other baby becomes a terror itself, as expressed through an excellent performance."

References

External links
 
 

2017 horror films
Canadian psychological horror films
Canadian supernatural horror films
English-language Canadian films
2010s English-language films
2010s psychological horror films
2010s Canadian films